The men's tournament of handball at the 2011 Pan American Games in Guadalajara, Mexico, began on October 16 and ended on October 24. All games were held at the San Rafael Gymnasium. The defending champions were Brazil, who won the title on home court. Argentina, the winner of the competition, qualified for the 2012 Summer Olympics in London, Great Britain.

Teams

Qualification
A National Olympic Committee may enter one men's team for the handball competition. Mexico, the host nation along with seven other countries qualified through regional competitions.

Canada versus United States Series

Canada won 51–48 on aggregate and qualified for the games.
The second game at the end of regulation was a 25–21 advantage for Canada, thus the game went to overtime.

Last chance qualifying tournament

 USA advance to the Pan American Games with a better goal differential. Puerto Rico withdrew from participating in the tournament.

Squads

At the start of tournament, all eight participating countries had 15 players on their rosters. Final squads for the tournament were due on September 14, 2011, a month  before the start of 2011 Pan American Games.

Format
 Eight teams are split into 2 preliminary round groups of 4 teams each. The top 2 teams from each group qualify for the knockout stage.
 The third and fourth placed teams will play the fifth to eight bracket.
 In the semifinals, the matchups are as follows: A1 vs. B2 and B1 vs. A2
 The winning teams from the semifinals play for the gold medal. The losing teams compete for the bronze medal.

Ties are broken via the following the criteria, with the first option used first, all the way down to the last option:
 Head to head results.
 Goal difference in the matches between the teams concerned.
 Greater number of plus goals in the matches between the teams concerned.

Draw
The draw for the tournament was held at the offices of the Organising Committee (COPAG) for the Games in Guadalajara on July 21 at 16:00 local time.

The competing are drawn to each group by couples. The first team selected randomly in the draw goes to group A and the second to Group B. The pots are based on the performance of national teams in both previous games and their standings in their respective regional competitions.

Preliminary round
All times are local (UTC-5).

Group A

Group B

Elimination stage

Semifinals

5th–8th place semifinals

Seventh place match

Fifth place match

Bronze medal match

Gold medal match

Final standings

Medalists

References

External links
Schedule

Handball at the 2011 Pan American Games